The 2011–12 season was Hamilton Academical's first season back in the Scottish First Division, having been relegated from the Scottish Premier League at the end of the 2010–11 season. Hamilton also competed in the Challenge Cup, League Cup and the Scottish Cup.

Summary
Hamilton finished fourth in the First Division. They reached the second round of the League Cup, the fourth round of the Scottish Cup and lost 1–0 to Falkirk in the final of the Challenge Cup.

Results and fixtures

Pre-season

Scottish First Division

Challenge Cup

Scottish League Cup

Scottish Cup

Player statistics

Captains

Squad 
Last updated 5 May 2012

|}

Disciplinary record
Includes all competitive matches.
Last updated 5 May 2012

Awards

Last updated 5 May 2012

League table

Transfers

Players in

Players out

References

Hamilton Academical F.C. seasons
Hamilton Academical